Maaria Siren (born 22 July 1977) is a Finnish former racing cyclist. She won the Finnish national road race title in 2003.

References

External links

1977 births
Living people
Finnish female cyclists
Place of birth missing (living people)